Rawu (also known as Rawok) is the name of a town in Baxoi County, Qamdo Prefecture, part of the Tibet Autonomous Region of China. The modern town (population about 2,900) of about 20 shops and hotels services the loggers and nearby military base.

Description
The town of Rawu is quite close to the original Tibetan village. To the southeast of the village is a large chorten and a small temple overlooking the Ngan-tso or Ranwu Lake, which is surrounded by snow-capped peaks and forests. There are small villages on both shores. The main industry other than tourism is logging.

References

See also
List of towns and villages in Tibet

Populated places in Nyingchi
Township-level divisions of Tibet